Ranjith K. Govind (born 21 February 1977), also known as K.G. Ranjith, is an Indian playback singer, working in the Tamil, Telugu, Malayalam and Kannada film industries and has sung more than 2500 songs.

Early life
Ranjith was born in Chennai, India into a Malayali family, hailing from Kalluvazhi, Kerala. He grew up listening to various kinds of music. He used to stay in a locality where there were many Keralites, and had a chance to participate in the local programs there. Later, a family friend suggested that he be trained in classical music. He learned Hindustani music and Carnatic music. He was trained by Vidwan Cuddalore Subramanian, K. S. Kanakasingam, Trichur P. Ramankutty and P. S. Narayana Swamy. He became popular when he won the Sun TV Saptha Swarangal singing contest in 2001. He is married to a trained Bharata Naatiyam dancer, Reshmi Menon. He has a daughter and a son.

Career
Mani Sharma introduced Ranjith as a playback singer, calling him to sing the song "Adugu Adugu" for the Telugu film Bobby (2002) alongside accomplished singer, Hariharan. Ranjith's first Tamil song was "Hey Penne" from Aasai Aasaiyai (2002), also composed by Mani Sharma. However, the song which gained Ranjith popularity was "Suppose" from the film Sukran (2005). In 2007, he sang his first song in his mother tongue Malayalam, "Innoru Paattonnu Paadaan" for the film Kilukkam Kilukilukkam. Ranjith was nominated for the Best Male Playback Singer prize in the Telugu category at the 56th Filmfare Awards South for the song "Entavaraku" from Gamyam (2009).

In 2005, Ranjith composed, arranged and performed an ensemble of Ayyappa Namaskara Slokas that was compiled into an album titled Saranam Ayyappa. He further composed and arranged the music for the dance ensemble Panchamukhi. He has worked often with Yuvan Shankar Raja, Vidyasagar and other music directors in Tamil.

Songs

References

External links
 
 
 Ranjith's discography
 

Telugu playback singers
Malayalam playback singers
Living people
Singers from Chennai
Indian male playback singers
Kannada playback singers
Tamil playback singers
1977 births
International Tamil Film Award winners